La Nouvelle tribu is a 1996 French mini series directed by Roger Vadim starring Marie-Christine Barrault and Sagamore Stévenin.

External links
Mini series information at IMDb

1996 French television series debuts